Alexander Vladimirovich Rybakov (Russian: Александр Владимирович Рыбаков; born 17 May 1988) is a Russian former cyclist. He rode for UCI WorldTeam  in 2014.

Major results

2006
 3rd  Team pursuit, UEC European Junior Track Championships
2007
 10th Overall Volta a Lleida
2008
 7th Overall Volta a Lleida
2011
 2nd Team pursuit, National Track Championships
2012
 1st Memorial Oleg Dyachenko
 5th Overall Grand Prix of Adygeya
 5th Overall Grand Prix of Sochi
 8th Gran Premio Città di Camaiore
 8th Duo Normand (with Ilnur Zakarin)
2013
 1st Memorial Oleg Dyachenko
 10th Overall Tour of Slovenia
2015
 8th Memorial Oleg Dyachenko

References

External links

1988 births
Living people
Russian male cyclists
Sportspeople from Narva
21st-century Russian people